Pozen may refer to: 

Leonid Pozen (1849–1921), Russo-Ukrainian sculptor and politician
Robert Pozen (born 1946), American financial executive 
Pozen (river), a tributary of the Suceava in Romania

See also
Posen (disambiguation)